is a former Japanese football player and manager.

Playing career
Murata was born in Tokyo on August 8, 1972. He joined Yomiuri (later Verdy Kawasaki) from youth team in 1990. However he could not play at all in the match in top team. In 1995 he moved to Toshiba (later Consadole Sapporo). He became a regular player as left side-back. The club won the champions in 1997 and was promoted to J1 League. However the club was relegated to J2 League in a year. In 2000, his opportunity to play decreased and he moved to J2 club Vegalta Sendai in 2001. He played as regular player and the club was promoted to J1 end of 2001 season. In 2003, he lost his opportunity to play and moved to Omiya Ardija in June. He returned to Vegalta in 2004 and retired end of 2004 season.

Coaching career
After retirement, Murata moved to Italy and became a coach for ChievoVerona in 2005. He mainly coached youth team until 2007. In 2008, he returned to Japan and joined his old club Consadole Sapporo. He mainly served as scout and coach for top team. In 2014, he moved to L.League club Nippon TV Beleza and became a coach. In September 2014, he moved to Tokyo Verdy and served a coach until 2016. In 2017, he returned to Nippon TV Beleza. In 2018, he moved to Japan Football League club Cobaltore Onagawa and became a manager.

Club statistics

References

External links

Vegalta Sendai

1972 births
Living people
Association football people from Tokyo
Japanese footballers
Japan Soccer League players
J1 League players
J2 League players
Japan Football League (1992–1998) players
Tokyo Verdy players
Hokkaido Consadole Sapporo players
Vegalta Sendai players
Omiya Ardija players
Japanese football managers
Association football defenders